Konstatinos Kontomanolis (Κωνσταντίνος "Κώστας" Κοντομανώλης, born 25 August 1957) is a Greek rower. He competed at the 1980 Summer Olympics and the 1984 Summer Olympics.

References

1957 births
Living people
Greek male rowers
Olympic rowers of Greece
Rowers at the 1980 Summer Olympics
Rowers at the 1984 Summer Olympics
Place of birth missing (living people)